Southwater & Nuthurst is an electoral division of West Sussex in the United Kingdom and returns one member to sit on West Sussex County Council. The current County Councillor, Brad Watson, is also Cabinet Member for Communications.

Extent
The division covers the villages of Copsale, Crabtree, Lower Beeding, Mannings Heath, Maplehurst, Nuthurst and Southwater.

It comprises the following Horsham District wards: Nuthurst Ward and Southwater Ward; and of the following civil parishes: Lower Beeding, Nuthurst and Southwater.

Election results

2013 Election
Results of the election held on 2 May 2013:

2009 Election
Results of the election held on 4 June 2009:

2005 Election
Results of the election held on 5 May 2005:

References
Election Results - West Sussex County Council

External links
 West Sussex County Council
 Election Maps

Electoral Divisions of West Sussex